
Wushi may refer to:

 Wushi language in Cameroon
 Wushi oil field in South China Sea

Locations in China

County
 Uqturpan County, or Wushi County, Aksu Prefecture, Xinjiang

Towns written as  
 Wushi, Pingjiang, Pingjiang County, Hunan province

Towns written as  
 Wushi, Anhui, in Huangshan District, Huangshan City
 Wushi, Leizhou, Guangdong
 Wushi, Shaoguan, in Qujiang District, Shaoguan, Guangdong
 Wushi, Guangxi, in Luchuan County
 Wushi, Xiangtan, Hunan
 Wushi, Jiangxi, in Zixi County